The history of Pomerania starts shortly before 1000 AD with ongoing conquests by newly arrived Polans rulers. Before that, the area was recorded nearly 2000 years ago as Germania, and in modern-day times Pomerania is split between Germany and Poland. Its name comes from the Slavic po more, which means "land at the sea".

Settlement in the area started by the end of the Vistula Glacial Stage, about 13,000 years ago. Archeological traces have been found of various cultures during the Stone and Bronze Age, of Veneti and Germanic peoples during the Iron Age and, in the Middle Ages, Slavic tribes and Vikings. Starting in the 10th century, Piast Poland on several occasions acquired parts of the region from the south-east, while the Holy Roman Empire and Denmark reached the region in augmenting their territory to the west and north.

In the High Middle Ages, the area became Christian and was ruled by local dukes of the House of Pomerania and the Samborides, at various times vassals of Denmark, the Holy Roman Empire and Poland. From the late 12th century, the Griffin Duchy of Pomerania stayed with the Holy Roman Empire and the Principality of Rügen with Denmark, while Denmark, Brandenburg, Poland and the Teutonic Knights struggled for control in Samboride Pomerelia. The Teutonic Knights succeeded in annexing Pomerelia to their monastic state in the early 14th century. Meanwhile, the Ostsiedlung started to turn Pomerania into a German-settled area; the remaining Wends, who became known as Slovincians and Kashubians, continued to settle within the rural East. In 1325, the line of the princes of Rügen died out, and the principality was inherited by the House of Pomerania, themselves involved in the Brandenburg-Pomeranian conflict about superiority in their often internally divided duchy. In 1466, with the Teutonic Order's defeat, Pomerelia became subject to the Polish Crown as a part of Royal Prussia. While the Duchy of Pomerania adopted the Protestant Reformation in 1534, as part of the Empire by then termed the Holy Roman Empire of the German Nation, Kashubia remained with the Roman Catholic Church. The Thirty Years' and subsequent wars severely ravaged and depopulated most of Pomerania. With the extinction of the Griffin house during the same period, the Duchy of Pomerania was divided between the Swedish Empire and Brandenburg-Prussia in 1648.

Prussia gained the southern parts of Swedish Pomerania in 1720. It gained the remainder of Swedish Pomerania in 1815, when French occupation during the Napoleonic Wars was lifted. The former Brandenburg-Prussian Pomerania and the former Swedish parts were reorganized into the Prussian Province of Pomerania, while Pomerelia in the partitions of Poland was made part of the Province of West Prussia. With Prussia, both provinces joined the newly constituted German Empire in 1871. Following the empire's defeat in World War I, Pomerelia became part of the Second Polish Republic (Polish Corridor) and the Free City of Danzig was created. Germany's Province of Pomerania was expanded in 1938 to include northern parts of the former Province of Posen–West Prussia, and in 1939 the annexed Polish territories became the part of Nazi Germany known as Reichsgau Danzig-West Prussia. The Nazis deported the Pomeranian Jews to a reservation near Lublin and mass-murdered Jews, Poles and Kashubians in Pomerania, planning to eventually exterminate Jews and Poles and Germanise the Kashubians.

After Nazi Germany's defeat in World War II, the German–Polish border was shifted west to the Oder–Neisse line and all of Pomerania was placed under Soviet military control. The area west of the line became part of East Germany, the other areas part of the People's Republic of Poland even though it did not have a sizeable Polish population. The German population of the areas east of the line was expelled, and the area was resettled primarily with Poles, some of whom were themselves expellees from former eastern Poland) and some Ukrainians who were resettled under Operation Vistula) and Jews. Most of Western Pomerania stayed with Germany and was merged into Mecklenburg.

With the consolidation of Communism in East Germany and Poland, Pomerania was part of the Eastern Bloc. In the 1980s, the Solidarność movement in Gdańsk (Danzig) and the Wende movement in East Germany forced the Communists out of power and led to the establishment of democracy in both the Polish and German part of Pomerania.

Timeline 1945–present 

1945: The Oder-Neisse line becomes the border between Poland and Germany
5July 1945: In addition, Stettin/Szczecin and the mouth of the Oder River were assigned to Poland by the Soviet Union
1945–1949: Soviet military officials east of the Oder-Neisse line subsequently hand over administration to Polish officials, Farther Pomerania and the Stettin area reorganized in the Polish Szczecin Voivodeship
1945–1950: expulsion of nearly all Germans east of the line
since 1945: Farther Pomerania and other ethnically cleansed areas dubbed Recovered Territories and resettled primarily with Poles from Central Poland, but also with Poles from former eastern Poland, displaced Poles returning from forced labour in Nazi Germany, Ukrainians displaced by Operation Vistula, and Jews.
since 1945: population in Vorpommern nearly doubles due to influx of expellees
1945/46: Land reform in German Pomerania (Bodenreform)
1950: Koszalin Voivodeship split off Szczecin Voivodeship
1946–1952: Western Pomerania (Vorpommern) without the Stettin/Szczecin area and Wollin/Wolin was fused with Mecklenburg to form the East German state of Mecklenburg-Vorpommern, later Mecklenburg
since 1948: Poland adopts Soviet style economy
since 1949: East Germany adopts Soviet style economy
since 1950: Western Pomeranian peasants forced to join socialist LPG units
1952: German Pomerania partitioned between newly created administrative units ("Bezirk") Rostock, Neubrandenburg, and Frankfurt.
1970: Polish 1970 protests
1975: administrative reform of the Szczecin Voivodeship
1980: Solidarność movement emerges in Gdańsk and Szczecin, Communist rule in Poland starts to collapse
1986: new port built in Sassnitz-Neu Mukran for the railway ferry between East Germany and the Soviet Union
1989: Die Wende movement results in a collapse of Communist rule in East Germany 
1990: Western Pomerania becomes part of the newly re-established state of Mecklenburg-Vorpommern prior to German reunification
1990: systematical decline of shipbuilding in Polish Pomerania
1995: Pomerania euroregion established
1999: Koszalin Voivodeship and Szczecin Voivodeship with some parts of neighboring voivodeships Słupsk Voivodeship, Piła Voivodeship and Gorzów Voivodeship merged into West Pomeranian Voivodeship 
2007: the whole Pomerania in Schengen Area
2011: new administrative division of Mecklenburg-Vorpommern

See also 
 History of Denmark
 History of Germany
 History of Poland
 History of Sweden

Sources

References

Bibliography

Further reading 

English:
 Boehlke, LeRoy, Pomerania - Its People and Its History, Pommerscher Verein Freistadt, Germantown, WI, U.S.A., 1983.

German and Polish:
Jan Maria Piskorski et al. (Werner Buchholz, Jörg Hackmann, Alina Hutnikiewicz, Norbert Kersken, Hans-Werner Rautenberg, Wlodzimierz Stepinski, Zygmunt Szultka, Bogdan Wachowiak, Edward Wlodarczyk), Pommern im Wandel der Zeiten, Zamek Ksiazat Pomorskich, 1999, . This book is a co-edition of several German and Polish experts on Pomeranian history and covers the history of Pomerania, except for Pomerelia, from the earliest appearance of humans in the area until the end of the second millennium. It is also available in a Polish version (Pomorze poprzez wieki).

Polish:
 Gerard Labuda (ed.), Historia Pomorza, vol. I (to 1466), parts 1–2, Poznań 1969
 Gerard Labuda (ed.), Historia Pomorza, vol. II (1466–1815), parts 1–2, Poznań 1976
 Gerard Labuda (ed.), Historia Pomorza, vol. III (1815–1850), parts 1–3, Poznań
 Gerard Labuda (ed.), Historia Pomorza, vol. IV (1850–1918), part 1, Toruń 2003
 B. Śliwiński, "Poczet książąt gdańskich", Gdańsk 1997

German:
 Werner Buchholz et al., Pommern, Siedler, 1999/2002, 576 pages; this book is part of the Deutsche Geschichte im Osten Europas series and covers the history of the Duchy of Pomerania and Province of Pomerania from the 12th century to 1945, and Western Pomerania after 1945.
 Oskar Eggert, Geschichte Pommerns, Hamburg 1974, ; this book treats the history of Pomerania from pre-historic times up to about 1500.

 
History of Prussia
Kashubians
Pomerania
History of Pomerania by period
Pomerania